Blake Harrison is an English actor, comedian and dancer. He is best known for playing Neil Sutherland in the BAFTA-winning E4 comedy The Inbetweeners and more recently as 'Medium' Dan, in the ITV sitcom Kate & Koji since 2020.

Career
Harrison starred in three series and two subsequent films of the multi-award-winning comedy The Inbetweeners. Harrison's other television work includes the BBC Three comedies Way to Go and Him & Her, and Comedy Central's Big Bad World, The Bleak Old Shop of Stuff, and The Bill. Harrison also starred in all three seasons of The Increasingly Poor Decisions of Todd Margaret, created by David Cross.

His theatre work includes 'End of the Pier' at the Park Theatre in 2018, Step 9 of 12 at the Trafalgar Studios, London in 2012 and The Accidental Lives of Memories at the White Bear Theatre.

His film work includes Keeping Rosy with Maxine Peake, Madness in the Method and Re-Uniting the Rubins with Timothy Spall; he also starred in Her Eyes Met With Mine, a short film by Slightly Ajar Productions.

In 2014 he played Alfie in the ITV sitcom Edge of Heaven.

Harrison also provided the voice of Scoop in the British and American versions of the 2015 reboot of the British children's TV series Bob the Builder.

He played the part of Private Pike in the 2016 film remake of Dad's Army.

In 2018 he directed the award-winning short film Hooves of Clay, in which he also starred alongside Rebecca Humphries. Later he played Andrew Newton in A Very English Scandal.

Harrison also scored the winning penalty goal in the charitable event Soccer Aid in 2018.

In 2020 he was cast as 'Medium' Dan in ITV sitcom Kate & Koji.

Filmography

Film

Television

Personal life
Harrison is married to Kerry Ann Lynch. They live in Kent and have two children, a daughter and a son. Harrison is a fan of Millwall F.C.

He attended Bacon's College in Rotherhithe, South London.

References

External links

1985 births
Living people
21st-century English male actors
Alumni of East 15 Acting School
English male film actors
English male television actors
English male voice actors
Male actors from London
People educated at the BRIT School
People from Peckham